Namu (unknown – July 9, 1966) was a male captive killer whale. He was the first healthy killer whale to be captured and was the first to perform with a human in the water. He was the subject of much media attention, including a "starring" role in the 1966 film Namu, the Killer Whale.

History
In June 1965, William Lechkobit discovered a 22-foot (6.7m) male killer whale in his floating salmon net that had drifted close to shore near Namu, British Columbia.

While in captivity, Namu could eat 400 pounds of salmon a day. Namu was a popular attraction at the Seattle Marine Aquarium, and Griffin soon captured a female killer whale to be a companion for Namu. The female, named Shamu, was quickly leased and eventually sold to SeaWorld in San Diego. Namu survived just over one year in captivity and died on July 9, 1966.

Griffin expressed mixed feelings when Namu died, saying he wished Namu had succeeded in a supposed "break for freedom" which had resulted in his death. The necropsy actually evidenced that he had been ill with an "acute bacterial infection, likely contracted from sewage runoff in Elliott Bay" where Griffin had moved him.

Nevertheless, thousands of local fans wanted Griffin to get another orca. Aquariums all over the world also wanted Griffin to capture an orca for them.

It was later discovered through preserved recordings of his calls that Namu was from C1 Pod, one of the best known Northern Resident pods. He was thus given the alphanumeric code C11. It is suspected that the matriarch, C5, who died in 1995, was his mother. As of February 2010, Namu's presumed sister Koeye (C10) is still alive.

The United Artists film Namu, the Killer Whale (a.k.a. Namu, My Best Friend) was released in 1966 and 'starred' Namu in a fictional story set in the San Juan Islands. The name "Namu" was also later used as a show-name for different killer whales in SeaWorld shows.

See also

 List of individual cetaceans

References

External links
Excerpt from Apetalk & Whalespeak: The Quest of Interspecies Communication by Ted Crail. Contemporary Books inc. Chicago 1983
"Captive killer whale Namu arrives in Seattle on July 27, 1965", Washington State Historylink.org
"Era of the Orca Cowboys" by Daniel Francis and Gil Hewlett in The Tyee webzine, May 16, 2008
"Conversation-starved Killer In A Salmon Net" by Eric Whitehead, Sports Illustrated, 1965 July 12

Individual orcas
1966 animal deaths